Pat McGauley is a retired American soccer player who played in the North American Soccer League and the Major Indoor Soccer League.  He scored the winning goal in the 1983 NCAA Men's Division I Soccer Championship and the 1977 McGuire Cup.  He currently works for Anheuser-Busch as the Vice President of Innovation.

Youth
McGauley graduated from St. Mary's High School in St. Louis, Missouri.  McGauley attended Indiana University, playing on the men's soccer team which won the 1982 and 1983 NCAA Men's Division I Soccer Championship.  In the 1983 championship, he scored the game-winning goal in Hoosier's 1–0 victory over the Columbia Lions.

Professional
In October 1983, the St. Louis Steamers drafted McGauley in the second round of the Major Indoor Soccer League draft.  He signed with the Chicago Sting of the North American Soccer League and played in the 1984 Soccer Bowl Championship season.  In the fall of 1984, the Sting entered the MISL and McGauley then played three indoor seasons in Chicago.  In October 1987 McGauley retired from professional soccer.  He briefly played for the Sting's reserve team, then moved to Chicago Schwaben in the Chicago Metro League.

References

External links
 NASL stats

1961 births
Living people
American soccer players
Chicago Schwaben players
Chicago Sting (MISL) players
Chicago Sting (NASL) players
Indiana Hoosiers men's soccer players
Major Indoor Soccer League (1978–1992) players
North American Soccer League (1968–1984) players
Association football utility players
Association football defenders
Association football forwards